Fousseyni Béao (born 6 July 1994) is a Burkinabé international footballer who plays for Étoile Filante, as a defender.

Career
Born in Bobo-Dioulasso, he has played club football for RC Bobo Dioulasso and Étoile Filante.

He made his international debut for Burkina Faso in 2015.

References

1994 births
Living people
Burkinabé footballers
Burkina Faso international footballers
RC Bobo Dioulasso players
Étoile Filante de Ouagadougou players
Association football defenders
21st-century Burkinabé people
Burkina Faso A' international footballers
2018 African Nations Championship players